was a Tokyo councilwoman who committed suicide following allegations of petty theft. The circumstances of her death were initially thought to have been "mysterious." Asaki was notable in Tokyo for making comments critical of Soka Gakkai.

Scandal and death
In July 1995, she was accused of stealing a T-shirt from a clothing store. Asaki was never actually convicted of shoplifting, but Soka Gakkai claims that she was guilty, explaining, "In recent years, shoplifting by housewives has become a social issue." She offered a restaurant receipt as an alibi, but police discovered that it was forged. Several newsweeklies reported that the clothing store proprietor was a member of Soka Gakkai who could have invented the shoplifting charge. All of the newsweeklies were later sued for defamation for their reporting. On September 1, 1995, Asaki fell to her death from a sixth-story apartment building next to Higashi-Murayama Station. Police ruled the death a suicide. She was 51.

Conspiracy theory and lawsuits
On September 23, 1995, Asaki's widower and surviving daughter, as well as her coworker in the Tokyo city council, all made statements to the press to the effect that they believed Soka Gakkai was involved in Asaki's death. Their statements were reported by Time and several Japanese newsweeklies. Soka Gakkai's president compared the bereaved family to Aum Shinrikyo, a religious cult famous for dropping poison gas into the Tokyo subway system. The Gakkai sued Asaki's family and the newsweeklies that reported their allegations, and in 2001, courts awarded the Gakkai 2 million yen. In 2008 and 2009, Asaki's coworker Hozumi Yano won two defamation suits brought by Soka Gakkai for expressing his opinion that she was murdered. The Gakkai continues to claim that it has "prevailed in every defamation case in which Asaki's death was at issue."

The case was taken up by Zaitokukai and other right-wing groups.

References

Suicides by jumping in Japan
1944 births
1995 deaths
1995 suicides